Lancaster Herald of Arms in Ordinary is an English officer of arms at the College of Arms in London. The title of Lancaster Herald first occurs in 1347 at Calais, and to begin with this officer was a servant to the noble house of Lancaster.  As a retainer of John of Gaunt (1377–1399) Lancaster was advanced to the rank of King of Arms, and was later promoted to the royal household of Henry IV (Gaunt's son), and made king of the northern province. This arrangement continued until 1464, when Lancaster reverted to the rank of herald.  Since the reign of King Henry VII (1485–1509) Lancaster has been a herald in ordinary.  The badge of office is a red rose of Lancaster, royally crowned.

The office is currently vacant since the promotion of Robert Noel to Norroy and Ulster King of Arms in 2021.

Holders of the office

See also
 Heraldry
 Officer of Arms

References
Notes

Citations

Bibliography
 The College of Arms, Queen Victoria Street : being the sixteenth and final monograph of the London Survey Committee, Walter H. Godfrey, assisted by Sir Anthony Wagner, with a complete list of the officers of arms, prepared by H. Stanford London, (London, 1963)
 A History of the College of Arms &c, Mark Noble, (London, 1804)

External links
The College of Arms
CUHGS Officer of Arms Index

Offices of the College of Arms
1347 establishments in Europe